Headspace, a subsidiary of Headspace Health, is an English-American online company, specializing in meditation. It was incorporated in May 2010 in London, England, by Andy Puddicombe and Richard Pierson. It is headquartered in Santa Monica, California, with offices in San Francisco and London.

The company mainly operates through its online platform, which provides sessions of guided meditation to its registered users with the goal of mindfulness. Overall content is offered through a paid subscription service model.

History

Headspace was founded in May 2010, by Andy Puddicombe and Richard Pierson. Puddicombe is a former Buddhist monk, and Pierson has a background in marketing and new brand development.

Puddicombe cut short his university studies in Sports Science at the age of 22 and travelled to Asia to become a Buddhist monk. He was fully ordained at a Tibetan Monastery in the Himalayas. In 2004, he returned to the UK on a mission "to make meditation accessible, relevant and beneficial to as many people as possible". It was whilst running a meditation clinic in London that he met his future business partner, Rich Pierson.

Headspace began as an events company, holding mindfulness talks in and around London. Demand from attendees for a way to share these techniques led to Puddicombe and Pierson looking into developing a mobile app, with the first version of the Headspace app launching in 2012. Headspace employs over 100 staff, working between the Los Angeles, San Francisco and London offices.

In June 2017, Headspace hired Ross Hoffman as Chief Business Officer.

In June 2018, the company launched Headspace Health, a subsidiary aimed at developing FDA-approved meditation tools which would be prescribed to help treat a range of chronic diseases.

In August 2021, Headspace merged with online mental health platform Ginger in a deal valuing the combined company at $3 billion.

Product
Headspace provides guided meditation resources online, accessible to users through the company's website and via a mobile app on the iPhone and Android platforms. Users can access ten days of free content, after which they have the option to take out a monthly or annual subscription or continue with the free trial material.

In June 2014, Headspace launched version 2 of its platform. Content in version 2 of the app focused on four areas once users have completed the Foundation stage: health, performance, relationships and Headspace Pro. The app uses gamification to encourage users to complete and master a level of meditation before moving on to a more advanced section. Each session is about ten minutes long, usually in audio format.

In September 2022, Headspace withdrew its voice operated apps for Google Home and Alexa smart speakers.

Research
Headspace has been used in a number of clinical trials investigating the effects of mindfulness training. In one such study, researchers from UCL, funded by the British Heart Foundation, examined the impact of mindfulness on workplace stress in two major multi-national corporations, using the Headspace app as the intervention. The study found a significant increase in wellbeing, reductions in anxiety and depressive symptoms, significant reductions in diastolic blood pressures, significant increases in perceived job control, as well as a significant reduction in sleeping problems.

Publications
Three books by Headspace founder Andy Puddicombe are published by Hodder & Stoughton. 
Get Some Headspace (2011) comprises an introduction to the Headspace techniques, interwoven with Puddicombe's personal experience. It lays out the science behind mindfulness and its physical and mental health benefits, from productivity and focus to stress and anxiety relief.
The Headspace Diet (2013) teaches readers how to use mindfulness rather than fad diets to reach their ideal personal weight. The book focuses on teaching readers about creating a healthy relationship with food.
The Headspace Guide to... a Mindful Pregnancy (2015) instructs couples how to calmly navigate the anxieties and demands of pregnancy.

Netflix shows 

Headspace signed a three-series deal with Netflix, with each show being produced by Vox Media. The first series, Headspace Guide to Meditation has been released in January 2021 with Headspace Guide to Sleep released in April 2021. The third series, an interactive experience titled Unwind Your Mind where users get to choose their own meditation, was released in June 2021.

Media attention
Headspace has been featured on both UK and US television, appearing on The Today Show, BBC Breakfast News, ABC News, and The Dr. Oz Show. It was also featured on the BBC Two science documentary Horizon, which tested the efficacy of mindfulness using the Headspace app over an 8-week period. In laboratory experiments, the presenter, Dr. Michael Mosley, was found to have significantly reduced negative outlook. He also reported overcoming a decade-long battle with insomnia. The product has also been mentioned on NPR and in publications such as Martha Stewart in the US.

In November 2012, Headspace founder Andy Puddicombe gave a TED Talk, entitled "All It Takes Is 10 Mindful Minutes", outlining the benefits of taking time out each day to practise mindfulness.

References

External links
 

Android (operating system) software
IOS software
Mindfulness movement
Subscription services
Gamification
2021 mergers and acquisitions